Roskilde Amt is a former county on the island of Zealand (Sjælland) in eastern Denmark. The county was abolished effective January 1, 2007, when it merged into Region Sjælland (i.e. Region Zealand).

Roskilde is also the name of the county's capital, and the name of a municipality. The small city of Roskilde is located 30 km west of Copenhagen. Danish kings were traditionally crowned there, in the Roskilde Cathedral. Roskilde is also home to the Viking Ship Museum, an "alternative" university, and the popular Roskilde Festival, annual music festival.

Municipalities (1970-2006)
Bramsnæs
Greve
Gundsø
Hvalsø
Køge
Lejre
Ramsø
Roskilde
Skovbo
Solrød
Vallø

Former counties of Denmark (1970–2006)
Region Zealand